Rypka may refer to:
Ritinis, a Lithuanian national sports game 
Rypka, the ball used in the game of ritinis
Jan Rypka (1886-1968), Czech orientalist, translator, professor of Iranology